Olga Danilov (born November 27, 1973) is an Israeli short track speed skater.

Personal life
She was born in Kharkiv, Ukraine. Danilov moved to Israel in 1994, following her sister. She is married to Olympian shooter Aleksandr Danilov, and has a daughter, Nicole. She has lived in Metulla, Israel.

Speed skating career
Competing for Israel at the 2002 Winter Olympics in Salt Lake City, in short track speed skating women's 1,500 metres Danilov came in 14th, competing in 500 metres she came in 16th, and competing in 1,000 metres she came in 21st.

References

External links
 

1973 births
Living people
Israeli female short track speed skaters
Olympic short track speed skaters of Israel
Short track speed skaters at the 2002 Winter Olympics
Sportspeople from Kharkiv
People from Metula